Teucer of Babylon (also spelled Teukros and Tinkalūŝā) was an ancient Egyptian astrologer of uncertain date, though likely in or before the first century AD.  David Pingree concluded that he is used as a source by Vettius Valens and Rhetorius, which dates him to at least the first century AD, while Wolfgang Hübner argues Marcus Manilius and Julius Firmicus Maternus drew on some of his materials, dating him to at least the first century BC. Teucer is mentioned by the philosopher Porphyry, which places him definitively before the third century AD.

The "Babylon" in his name is the Babylon Fortress near Cairo.

He combined the zodiac with melothesia and geography, and created many unconventional constellations and is very important for the paranatellonta (constellations that rise together with certain degrees of the zodiacal signs).

His work was translated into Middle Persian, which was then translated into Arabiac.
 
We know fragments of three texts:
 paranatellonta of the 36 decans, ed. F. Boll, Sphaera (1903), 16–21), id. , CCAG VII (1908), 156–214; the end from Aquarius 18° until Pisces 30°: W. Hübner, Grade und Gradbezirke (1995), I 126f., aside with Latin translation, probably from 10th century) and Commentary II 94-103
 paranatellonta of certain degrees of the zodiacal signs (with some hexametrical traces), ed. F. Boll, Sphaera (1903), 41–52; W. Hübner, ibid. I 108-127 (from Aries 1° until Aquarius 18°, aside with Latin translation, probably from 10th century) and Commentary II 1-93
 paranatellonta of the decans, ed. St. Weinstock, CCAG IX 2 (1953), p. 180-186

Bibliography
 D. Pingree, The Yavanajātaka of Sphujidhvaja (1978), II 442-443
 W. Hübner, Grade und Gradbezirke (1995)
 Id., Manilius, Astronomica V (2010)
 Zdravko Blažeković, Music in Medieval and Renaissance Astrological Imagery, Ph.D. diss, The Graduate Center, City University of New York, 1997.

Notes

External links

Ancient Greek astronomers
1st-century Egyptian people
Ancient Egyptian astrologers